The ancestors of Rama, the protagonist of the Ramayana, are described below according to Vishnu Purana and Valmiki Ramayana. The famous personalities of Suryavamsha as per the Vishnu Purana, Valmiki Ramayana, Ramakatha Rasavahini, Bhagavata Purana, and Raghuvamsha Charitram are Ikshvaku, Vikushi, Kakusta, etc. According to Hinduism, the city of Kosala and Ayodhya were founded by Manu (the earliest Prajapati) and by his son Ikshvaku, whose descendant was Rama.

 Brahma
 Marichi
 Kashyapa
 Vivasvan (Surya)
 Shraddhadeva Manu

Suryavamsha

 Ikshvaku
 Vikukshi (Sasaka)
 Puranjaya (Kakutstha)
 Anena (Suyodhana or Anaranya)
 Prithu
 Vistrashva (contemporary of Ravana of Lanka)
 Vishwagashwa (contemporary of King Pururavas who founded Chandravamsha)
 Shravasta founded the city of Shravasti.
 Brihadashva
 Kuvalayashva (Dundhumara)
 Dridhashva
 Haryashva
 Amitashva
 Krishashva
 Prasenjit was the maternal grandfather of Parashurama
 Yuvanashva(2)
 Mandhata (a contemporary of Parashurama, Druhyu king Arabdha and demon King Madhu and Lavanasura)
 Muchukunda fought in the Devasura War. So, his younger brother Purukutsa became the king. (a contemporary of Druhyu King Gandhara who founded the Gandhara Kingdom)
 Trasadasyu
 Sambhuta
 Anaranya(2) was killed by Ravana. (a contemporary of Anu King Janamejaya)
 Prishadashva
 Sumanas
 Tridhanwan (contemporary of Anu King Shibi who founded the Sivi Kingdom)
 Trayarunya
 Trishanku (Satyavrata) (a contemporary of Anu Kings, Vrshadarbha of Sivi Kingdom, Setuka, Madra who founded the Madra Kingdom and Kekaya who founded the Kekaya Kingdom)
 Harischandra (a contemporary of Anu King Ashvapati who was the father of Savitri)
 Rohitashva (contemporary of Haihaya king Kritavirya and Satyavan and Savitri)
 Vijaya (contemporary of Anu King Sauvira who founded Sauvira Kingdom)
 Bahuka (Asita)
 Sagara
 Asamanja
 Amshuman
 Dilipa
 Bhagiratha
 Sindhudvipa (contemporary of Anu King Bali (Chandravanshi))
 Rituparna (contemporary of Nala and Damayanti)
 Sarvakama
 Sudasa (contemporary of Anu Kings, Anga, Vanga, Kalinga, Pundra, Suhma, and Odra  who founded the Anga, Vanga, Kalinga, Pundra, Suhma, and Odra kingdoms)
 Kalmashapada (Mitrasaha or Saudasa or Veerasaha)
 Asmaka
 Mulaka (Contemporary of Parashurama, he saved himself by hiding amongst women when Parashurama was destroying the Kshatriyas)
 Vishvasaha
 Anaranya(3)
 Khatvanga
 Dilīpa (Deerghabahu)
 Raghu
 Aja (Contemporary of Chandravanshi King Yayati)
 Dasharatha (contemporary of Videha King Janaka(2), Anu Kings of Kekaya Ashwapati and Yuddhajit, Dakshina Kosala king Sukaushal, Kasi Kings Bhimaratha and Divodasa and Druhyu King Nagnajit(1))
 Rama (a contemporary of Yadava King Satvata, an ancestor of Krishna, Kashi King Pratardhana, and Anga King Chaturanga)
 Lava inherited Shravasti and founded Lavapuri and Kusha inherited Kusavati.
 Kanikamalika was the daughter of King Kusha and Naga queen Kumudvati. She married the Yadava king Mahabhoja.
 King Raivata

Notes

Versions

External links
Ikshvaku Dynasty 
Suryavamsha

Rama